"Candy Cane Children" is a single by American garage rock band The White Stripes. Released in late November 2002, this Christmas song is featured on the independent holiday-themed compilation Surprise Package Volume 2, released in 1998. The album title is a reference to die-hard fans of The White Stripes, who are called "Candy Cane Children".

On the 7" vinyl record there are inscriptions on Side A and Side B. Side A reads: "Whammy=Santa Voice". Side B reads: "Ghosts in the background".

Track listing
"Candy Cane Children"
"The Reading of the Story of the Magi"
"The Singing of Silent Night"

References
White Stripes.net Retrieved September 9, 2005.
The White Stripes Retrieved September 9, 2005.

2002 singles
The White Stripes songs
American Christmas songs
XL Recordings singles
V2 Records singles
Third Man Records singles
Songs written by Jack White
Music fandom